Bernd Glemser (born 1962, Dürbheim) is a German pianist. A student of Vitaly Margulis, in 1989 he became Germany's youngest piano professor at Saarbrücken's Musikhochschule.

He has recorded major pieces by Rachmaninoff, Prokofiev, Schumann, Scriabin, and Tchaikovsky as well as pieces by Liszt, Tausig, Godowsky and Busoni.

In 2003 Glemser was decorated with the Bundesverdienstkreuz.

His recording of Rachmaninoff's Piano Concerto No. 2 was featured in the 2007 film Spider-Man 3.

References

External links
 Bernd Glemser at Naxos Records webpage.
 Bernd Glemser at Oehms Classics webpage.

Living people
1962 births
German classical pianists
Male classical pianists
Prize-winners of the Paloma O'Shea International Piano Competition
Sydney International Piano Competition prize-winners
Maria Canals International Music Competition prize-winners
Prize-winners of the Ferruccio Busoni International Piano Competition
Recipients of the Cross of the Order of Merit of the Federal Republic of Germany
21st-century classical pianists
Oehms Classics artists
21st-century male musicians